Didymops floridensis, the Florida cruiser, is a species of cruiser in the family of dragonflies known as Corduliidae. It is found in North America.

The IUCN conservation status of Didymops floridensis is "LC", least concern, with no immediate threat to the species' survival.

References

Further reading

External links

 

Corduliidae
Articles created by Qbugbot
Insects described in 1921